Suicide Notes from Beautiful Girls is a thriller YA novel written by American author Lynn Weingarten.

Plot 
June and Delia used to be best friends; the type of friendship that you think is going to last forever. Built upon shared love, experiences, and secrets, one night everything goes too far. Now they haven't spoken for a year. Then an announcement at school that Delia is dead leaves June reeling and unable to believe her friend's actions.  Pushed by Delia's ex-boyfriend Jeremiah, June begins to wonder if it really was suicide at all – or was Delia murdered.

References

2015 American novels
American young adult novels
American thriller novels
Simon & Schuster books
Electric Monkey books